Fulgencio Obelmejias (born January 1, 1953), sometimes known also as Fully Obel is a Venezuelan former boxer, who was world super-middleweight champion.

Biography
Obelmejias was born in San José de Río Chico. He represented his native country at the 1975 Pan American Games in Mexico City, where he lost his first fight to Ricardo Arce of Argentina. He also competed at the 1976 Summer Olympics in Montreal, Canada, where he was eliminated in the first round by Cuba's eventual bronze medalist Luis Felipe Martínez.

Professional career

He began his professional career, in the Middleweight division, on January 30, 1977, knocking out Franklin Suzarra in the first round at Caracas. After another win over Suzarra, he embarked on a tour of Mexico and southern California, having six consecutive fights in those areas from October 1977 to April 1978. In his first fight abroad as a professional, held at Mexico City, he worked for nine rounds in only his third professional bout before knocking out Jesus Garcia Ortiz. His second to last fight of that tour was against Abel Cordoba, whom he beat by a ten-round decision in Tuxtla Gutierrez on February 27. His last fight on that tour, against Rudy Robles in Tijuana on April 3, marked the beginning of a seventeen fight knockout win streak. He knocked out Robles in four rounds.

After the fight with Robles, Obelmejias had six consecutive fights in his native Venezuela, including a win over Johnny Heard. He then returned to Mexico, to fight for the Fecarbox Middleweight title against Carlos Marks on December 17 in Culiacán. He won the regional title, as well as a top ten ranking at the Middleweight division by the WBC, by knocking Marks out in nine rounds.

Obelmejias kept winning fights by knockouts, and, on March 3 of 1980, he got one of the biggest wins of his career, when he beat former WBC world Jr. Middleweight champion Elisha Obed in three rounds at Caracas.

After eight more wins, all by knockout, Obelmejias was made the number one contender for the world Middleweight title by the WBC.

When his first chance to become a world champion arrived, on January 17 of 1981, many Venezuelans had faith that he would become world champion; his record at the time (30-0 with 28 knockouts) impressed many boxing fans. However, Obelmejias lost for the first time, being handed an eighth-round knockout loss by then world champion Marvin Hagler in an HBO Boxing televised fight that took place at the famed Boston Garden, home of the NBA basketball's Boston Celtics.

Obelmejias won eight fights in a row, all by knockout, before being given a rematch by Hagler. Among those beaten during that new streak were former world Jr. Middleweight champion Eddie Gazo, beaten in two rounds in Caracas, future world champion Chong-Pal Park, knocked out in eight rounds, also in Caracas, and Alfredo Escalera's cousin, Reyes Escalera, also beaten in two rounds, in Barquisimeto.

On October 30 of 1982, he and Hagler had a rematch which was, once again, shown in the United States by HBO. The second time around, Hagler defeated Obelmejias by a knockout in five rounds at Sanremo, Italy. Both Hagler and Obelmejias fell in love with Italy and the country's culture. Obelmejias established himself there immediately after the rematch with Hagler.  Hagler moved to Italy as soon as he lost the world Middleweight title to Sugar Ray Leonard in 1987.

After his rematch with Hagler, Obelmejias won nine straight bouts before being upset, on July 27 of 1985, by Clarence Osby.  Amongst the quality fighters that he defeated during that nine fight winning streak were Jeff Lampkin, beaten by an eight-round decision, Jerry Celestine, also beaten over eight rounds, and Eric Winbush, who was beaten in Monte Carlo by another eight-round decision.

Then, on May 30 of 1986, he became the Caribbean Light-Heavyweight champion, when he outpointed Tomas Polo Ruiz over ten rounds at Isla Margarita.

He lost the title in his first defense, when he was knocked out by future world champion Leslie Stewart in four rounds, at Trinidad and Tobago on November 15 of 1986.

After one more win, he was given a third try at becoming a world champion, when the Lineal and WBA Super Middleweight champion, Obelmejias' former rival, Chong-Pal Park, offered him a shot.

The third time proved to be the charm for Obelmejias, when he beat Park by a twelve-round decision on May 23, 1988 at South Korea. With that win, Obelmejias had fulfilled his lifelong dream; as well as the dream of his fans' of becoming a world champion.

His stint as world champion did not last long, however, and he lost the title during his first defense, 370 days after winning it, being knocked out in eleven rounds by In-Chul Baek, also in South Korea.

Retirement 
Obelmejias retired for good after three more wins; he was approaching, at 38, the mandatory boxing retirement age of 40 in Venezuela after his last fight, a ten-round decision win over Eduardo Rodriguez.

Obelmejias had a record of 52 wins and five losses, with 41 wins by way of knockout.

Professional boxing record

See also
List of super middleweight boxing champions
List of WBA world champions

References

External links 
 
Fulgencio Obelmejias - CBZ Profile

1953 births
Living people
Boxers at the 1975 Pan American Games
Pan American Games competitors for Venezuela
Olympic boxers of Venezuela
Boxers at the 1976 Summer Olympics
Venezuelan male boxers
Middleweight boxers
People from Miranda (state)
20th-century Venezuelan people